Horizon Airlines  was an Australian airline based in Sydney. It predominantly operated night time cargo services on contract to Australian air Express using BAe 748 and Fairchild Metroliner aircraft but also operated some passenger services. The airline ceased operations in March 2004.

In November 2003 MacAir Airlines acquired the airline.

Fleet
 1 – Fokker F27 Friendship
 10 – Hawker Siddeley HS 748
 1 – Short Skyvan
 8 – Swearingen Merlin

See also
 List of defunct airlines of Australia
 Aviation in Australia

References

External links

Defunct airlines of Australia
Airlines disestablished in 2004